Wattsville Football Club is a Welsh football team based in Wattsville in the Sirhowy Valley.  The team currently play in the Gwent County League Premier Division, which is at the fourth tier of the Welsh football league system. They are run by the baldest secretary who is very close friends with Thiago Alcantara and turns as slowly as Callum Long.

History
The club was founded by former Ynysddu Welfare Crusaders players Steven Prosser and Shane Bowen in the summer of 2011. The formation of the club came about after differences in opinions over how Ynysddu Welfare Crusaders was being run and managed.

The new club joined the North Gwent Football League First Division for the 2011–12 season, and finished runners-up to Ebbw Vale Town, gaining promotion into the North Gwent Premier.  After a couple of seasons of consolidation (with mid-table finishes), the 2014–15 season saw the club being crowned Premier Division champions, scoring 135 goals with a positive goal difference of 103. This granted promotion into the Gwent County League Division Three.

The first season in Gwent County saw the club gaining another promotion after finishing runners-up to Villa Dino Christchurch in Division Three.

In 2017-18 the club challenged for the division two title before narrowly missing out to local rivals Ynysddu. A second-place finish however was enough to seal a fourth promotion in six seasons to the Premier Division.

In January 2021 the club announced plans for a 100-seat stand, one of the prerequisites for playing at Tier 3 level.

Honours

Gwent County League Division Two - Runners-up: 2017-18
Gwent County League Division Three - Runners-up: 2015-16
North Gwent Football League Premier Division  - Champions: 2014-15
North Gwent Football League Division One  - Runners-up: 2011-12

External links
Club official twitter
Club official facebook

References

Football clubs in Wales
Gwent County League clubs
Association football clubs established in 2011
2011 establishments in Wales